Zhier Fan (born April 12, 2004) is an American competitive swimmer. He is a world junior record holder in the 4×50-meter mixed medley relay. At the 2022 Junior Pan Pacific Championships, he won gold medals in the 100-meter breaststroke, 4×100-meter medley relay, 4×100-meter mixed medley relay, and won the b-final of the 200-meter breaststroke.

Background
Fan attends Stanford University and competes collegiately for Stanford Cardinal.

Career

2021 Swimming World Cup
At the first stop of the 2021 FINA Swimming World Cup circuit, the first weekend of October in Berlin, Germany, Fan set a personal best time of 2:06.06 in the final of the 200-meter breaststroke, finishing 0.69 seconds behind bronze medalist Fabian Schwingenschlögl of Germany. He also set a world junior record in the final of 4×50-meter mixed medley relay, contributing a time of 26.79 seconds for the 50-meter breaststroke portion of the relay to help win the silver with a time of 1:41.55. The following stop, conducted the following week at Danube Arena in Budapest, Hungary, he placed fourth in the 100-meter breaststroke with a personal best time of 57.91 seconds, which was 0.20 seconds slower than bronze medalist Andrius Šidlauskas of Lithuania. In the 200-meter breaststroke, he won the bronze medal with a time of 2:06.18, finishing 4.11 seconds behind gold medalist Arno Kamminga of the Netherlands. For the 4×50-meter mixed medley relay, he improved upon his split time from the previous stop, lowering the time to a 26.75, and helping win the gold medal in a new world junior record time of 1:41.21.

Two months later, Fan won the 200-yard breaststroke at the 2021 Winter Junior National Championships edition West, held in December in Austin, Texas, with a personal best time of 1:52.92 that set a new Championships record in the event. He also helped place thirty-first in the 4×100-yard freestyle relay with a time of 3:06.03, splitting a 45.33 for the second leg of the relay.

2022 US International Team Trials
In April 2022, at the USA Swimming International Team Trials in Greensboro, North Carolina, Fan swam a personal best time of 1:00.64 in the preliminary heats of the 100-meter breaststroke, qualifying for the final where he went on to place eighth in 1:01.38, won the b-final of the 50-meter breaststroke with a personal best time of 28.07 seconds, placed eighth in the c-final of the 200-meter breaststroke with a 2:30.20, and placed 22nd in the 200-meter individual medley with a 2:03.46. Per his results in the 100-meter breaststroke, USA Swimming named him to the roster for the 2022 Junior Pan Pacific Swimming Championships in the event.

2022 Junior Pan Pacific Championships

The first day of competition at the 2022 Junior Pan Pacific Swimming Championships, contested at Veterans Memorial Aquatic Center in Honolulu beginning August 24, Fan won a gold medal in the 4×100-meter mixed medley relay, helping finish in a new Championships record time of 3:46.83 by splitting a 1:00.76 for the breaststroke leg of the relay. On the second day, he won the gold medal in the 100-meter breaststroke with a time of 1:00.74, finishing 0.61 seconds ahead of silver medalist Yamato Okadome of Japan and 1.04 seconds ahead of bronze medalist Nicholas Mahabir of Singapore. Two days later, and the final day of competition, he started competition in the evening finals session by winning the b-final of the 200-meter breaststroke with a time of 2:14.30. For his final event, he and finals relay teammates Daniel Diehl (backstroke), Thomas Heilman (butterfly), and Kaii Winkler (freestyle) set a Championships record of 3:26.65 and won the gold medal in the 4×100-meter medley relay, with Fan contributing a time of 1:01.52 for the 100-meter breaststroke portion of relay.

2022–2023: Freshman collegiate season
In January 2023, in a dual meet against the Arizona State Sun Devils, Fan achieved a duo of second-place finishes, one in the 100-yard breaststroke with a personal best time of 52.63 seconds and one in the 4×50-yard medley relay with relay teammates Leon MacAlister (backstroke), Andrey Minakov (butterfly), and Luke Maurer (freestyle). For his second of two individual breaststroke events at the meet, he finished fourth in the 200-yard breaststroke with a time of 1:56.33. He was the fastest Stanford Cardinal swimmer in each of his breaststroke events. At the dual meet against the USC Trojans in early February, he improved upon his placings in both of his breaststroke events, winning the 100-yard breaststroke with a time of 53.08 seconds and the 200-yard breaststroke with a time of 1:56.93. For the final dual meet of the season, against the California Golden Bears on February 18, he placed second in both the 100-yard breaststroke and the 200-yard breaststroke.

2023 Pac-12 Conference Championships
Launching into his first NCAA championships season at the 2023 Pac-12 Conference Championships, with competition contested at King County Aquatic Center in Federal Way, Washington, Fan was disqualified with his relay teammates in the 4×50-yard medley relay in the first finals session, on March 1. On the second day, he swam a personal best time of 1:44.87 in the preliminaries of the 200-yard individual medley and qualified for the c-final in the evening, where he went on to win the c-final in a personal best time of 1:44.09. He lowered his personal best time in the 100-yard breaststroke the following day twice as well, first to a 52.50 in the preliminaries to qualify for the final ranking seventh, then to a 51.97 in the final to place fifth. The following, and final, day, he placed fifth in the b-final of the 200-yard breaststroke with a time of 1:56.92.

International championships

Swimming World Cup circuits
The following medals Fan has won at Swimming World Cup circuits.

Personal best times

Long course meters (50 m pool)

Legend: h – preliminary heat; b – b-final

Short course meters (25 m pool)

Short course yards (25 yd pool)

World records

World junior records

Short course meters (25 m pool)

References

External links
 

2004 births
Living people
Swimmers from Texas
American male breaststroke swimmers
Stanford Cardinal men's swimmers